Jonathan Hill (born 11 December 1990) is a Filipino-Australian cricketer who is the current captain of the Philippines cricket team. Hill was born in Goulburn, New South Wales, Australia, and gained a Philippine passport in 2012, qualifying through his mother, who comes from Mindanao. He has played for the Philippines cricket team since 2017, and also works as a school teacher in Australia.

In December 2018, Hill lead the Philippines team, as they won Group B of the 2018–19 ICC T20 World Cup East Asia-Pacific Qualifier tournament, with Hill saying "there is something special about this side". Therefore, after winning the qualifier, the Philippines progressed to the Regional Finals, with Hill again named captain of the side for the tournament.

In March 2019, he was named in the Philippines squad for the Regional Finals of the 2018–19 ICC T20 World Cup East Asia-Pacific Qualifier tournament. He made his Twenty20 International (T20I) debut for the Philippines against Papua New Guinea on 22 March 2019.

In February 2022, he was named captain of the Philippines' team for the 2022 ICC Men's T20 World Cup Global Qualifier A tournament in Oman.

References

External links
 

1990 births
Living people
Australian people of Filipino descent
Sportspeople of Filipino descent
Australian cricketers
Filipino cricketers
Philippines Twenty20 International cricketers
People from Goulburn
Cricketers from New South Wales